Jack Fettes (born 30 November 2005) is a British semi-professional basketball player who most recently played for the Surrey Scorchers in the British Basketball League.

College career 
Fettes played for Charnwood College before joining the Three Rivers Academy in the Academy Basketball League. In 2017, the school announced a partnership with the Surrey Scorchers to become the club's new youth academy. As a result, Scorchers head coach Creon Raftopoulos also joined the team as assistant coach.

Professional career 
In 2018, Fettes joined Raftopoulos at the Surrey Scorchers in the British Basketball League.   Following the end of 2018-19 season, Jack Fettes was released - he is now a full time student with a substantial following on social media focusing on Mental & Physical Health.

References 

1999 births
Living people
British men's basketball players
Surrey Scorchers players
British Basketball League players
Guards (basketball)
Place of birth missing (living people)